Salisbury is an unincorporated historic community in Baker County, Oregon, United States.

The place was once named "Bennett", probably after a local resident. Salisbury post office, established in 1906 and closed in 1907, was named after Hiram H. Salisbury, a superintendent for the W. H. Eccles Lumber Company. Salisbury was also a station on the Sumpter Valley Railway. In 1940, Salisbury had a population of 4. As of 1980, "there was little evidence of commercial activity".

References

Unincorporated communities in Baker County, Oregon
1906 establishments in Oregon
Populated places established in 1906
Unincorporated communities in Oregon